"Don't Let Them" is the second and final single from Ashanti's third studio album, Concrete Rose (2004). The single was only released in the US, where it failed to chart, and the UK, reaching the Number 38 in the first week, but soon disappeared off the UK Charts, it dropped to number 57 in the second week, and being out in the 3rd week. It also samples Raekwon's "Heaven & Hell" (which itself samples "Could I Be Falling in Love?" by Syl Johnson). Ashanti fans wanted "Don't Leave Me Alone" as the second single because it was a fan favorite. However, Def Jam refused to release it. Ashanti later came out of pocket to deliver a second single, "Don't Let Them", to her fans. However, fans still refused to support "Don't Let Them". The single also gained minimal success in Ireland, peaking at 41.

Music video
The music video is a very romantic video because it shows the on-&-off relationships between a couple. It starts off with her from early in the morning and she also introduces the video play system. The video was shot in March 2005, early in the morning. The Inc. recording artist Chick Santana made a cameo in the music video. He portrays Ashanti's love interest.

Charts

References

2004 songs
2005 singles
Ashanti (singer) songs
Songs written by Ashanti (singer)
Songs written by Irv Gotti
Neo soul songs
Songs written by Willie Mitchell (musician)